Władysław Zygmunt Belina-Prażmowski (3 May 1888 in Ruszkowiec – 13 October 1938 in Venice), was a Polish cavalryman, colonel and politician.

He was a member of Związek Walki Czynnej since 1909, later Związek Strzelecki. Student of Lwów Politechnic in 1919–1913.

Serving under Józef Piłsudski, he became one of the first Polish soldiers - formally under Austrian command - who entered Russian-held Polish territory during the First World War. Member of Polish Legions, organizer and commander of 1st Regiment of Polish Uhlans and later 1st Brigade of Polish Uhlans. Later he fought in the Polish-Ukrainian War (1918–1919) and Polish-Soviet War (1919–1921). In April 1919 his troops were instrumental in taking Wilno. Piłsudski would declare Belina's cavalry action a most exquisite military action carried out by Polish cavalry in this war.

From 1929 he lived in Kraków and retired from the military. In 1931-1933 he was a mayor of Kraków and from 1933 to 1937, voivode of Lwów. In 1938 he retired from public work due to worsening health; he died later that year, aged fifty.

Honours and awards
 Gold Cross of the Order of Virtuti Militari
 Commander's Cross of the Order of Polonia Restituta
 Cross of Valour - five times
 Officers' badge "Parasol"
 Order of the Cross of the Eagle, Class II (Estonia, 1935)

See also 
 The Seven Lancers of Belina

1888 births
1928 deaths
People from Opatów County
Polish soldiers
Polish people of the Polish–Soviet War
Polish people of the Polish–Ukrainian War
Recipients of the Gold Cross of the Virtuti Militari
Commanders of the Order of Polonia Restituta
Recipients of the Cross of Valour (Poland)
Recipients of the Military Order of the Cross of the Eagle, Class II
Mayors of Kraków